Gary Francis McCauley (born 1 April 1940 in Cochrane, Ontario; died 13 May 2018 in Ottawa) was a Liberal party member of the House of Commons of Canada.  He was a clergyman (Anglican Church of Canada) and broadcaster by career.

McCauley attended General Theological Seminary in New York, graduating in 1966.

He represented New Brunswick's Moncton electoral district since winning that seat in the 1979 federal election. McCauley was re-elected in the 1980 election, but lost in 1984 to Dennis Cochrane of the Progressive Conservative party. McCauley served in the 31st and 32nd Canadian Parliaments.

Electoral record

References

External links
 

1940 births
2018 deaths
Members of the House of Commons of Canada from New Brunswick
Liberal Party of Canada MPs
People from Cochrane, Ontario